Nabokov is a crater on Mercury.  Its name was adopted by the International Astronomical Union (IAU) on April 24, 2012. Nabokov is named for the Russian and American author Vladimir Nabokov.

Nabokov is one of 110 peak ring basins on Mercury.  To the west is another peak-ring basin, Holst, of similar size.  To the north of Nabokov is Martins crater, and to the northeast is Barney.  Nabokov lies on the east side of the ancient Lennon-Picasso Basin.

References

Impact craters on Mercury